St Mary Magdalene Church is parish of the Catholic Church established in 1833, coming under the Archdiocese of Verapoly in Moothedam, Kerala, India. Mary Magdalene is its patron saint.

The church is situated just off NH47 near to Kundannor junction and situated on the adjacent side of NH49 near to P.S Mission Hospital. The church compound contains St. Mary Magdalene Church and St. Mary's UP school which also comes under Church management.

PS Mission Hospital was founded by Msgr. Alexander Vadakumthala to provide health care to all especially to the poor and underprivileged. The hospital was started as a clinic on 11 February 1961 at Maradu in Kochi, Kerala, India. The clinic became a 150-bedded multispeciality hospital. The old building was demolished in 2017, and it become a 100-bedded hospital.

This parish constitutes below 5 substations:

1. Little Flower church Kundannoor 
2. St. Antony's church.
3. St. Martin de Porous church 
4. St. Joseph's Church
5. Tomb of Vakayil Achan and Church Cemetery.

The tomb of the Servant of God Fr. George Vakayil is situated in the church cemetery. 

Fr. Joseph Chelat (Vicar Forane) is the parish priest and Fr. Midhun Joseph Chemmayath is the assistant parish priest.

Vakayil Achan (Servant of God)
St. Mary Magdalene Church Maradu Moothedam holds the tomb of Servant of God - Vakayil Achan or Achan Punyalan, in cemetery chapel. The Death Anniversary of Fr. George Vakayil is observed by the church as a day of remembrance every 4 November. Thousands of devotees participate in the "Nerchasadya" and Holy Mass and on that day. Fr. George Vakayil was declared as Servant of God on 1 September 2013 at St. Mary Magdalene Church Maradu Moothedam by Metropolitan Archbishop Francis Kallarakkal.

Vakayil was born at Vakayil Family in Koonammavu, as the second child of Paily and Francisca. He started his lessons of catechism and academic studies at St.Philomena's Forane Church, Koonammavu and the school affiliated to the said church. He lost his mother at the age of seven. George Vakayil and was taken care of by his elder brother’s wife. Vakayil was keen on attending the holy mass every day and he served as an altar boy in his home parish. He joined St. Albert's High School, Ernakulam and passed the matriculation. Later he joined in Puthanpalli Seminary where he completed his pastoral studies.

Vakayil served at Good Sheperd’s Church at Kottayam, Churches at Kurichi and Thottakam. It was reported that, when he was serving as a priest at Kurichi, he met with an accident while he was moving in cycle through a hilly area. Kurichi was a hilly area where he worked among the poor and downtrodden. He was instrumental in constructing houses for the destitute, helping the poor and ailing patients etc.

References

Churches in Ernakulam district
Roman Catholic churches in Kerala
Religious organizations established in 1833
Roman Catholic churches completed in 1833